Thipkyanchi Rangoli is an Indian Marathi language drama television series directed by Girish Vasaikar.

It is airing on Star Pravah from 4 October 2021. It stars Dnyanada Ramtirthkar and Chetan Vadnere in lead roles.

Plot 
Apoorva (Appu), a sophisticated upper-class girl, crosses paths with Shashank, a scholar who belongs to a middle-class joint family, and everything changes. Apart from a beautiful love story, It narrates the tale of a joint family, its roots and beliefs. After a few meetings with Shashank, Appu's father decides to marry Appu off with Shashank to teach her morals and ethics. Although Appu is a little ill-mannered, she is very good at heart and gets deserved love from Shashank' s family. She becomes a part of the family and stands by them through all their difficulties.

Cast

Main 
 Dnyanada Ramtirthkar as Apoorva Kaushik Vartak / Apoorva Shashank Kanitkar (Appu) – Kaushik and Anjali's daughter; Netra's cousin; Shashank's wife.
 Chetan Vadnere as Shashank Vithhal Kanitkar – Vitthal and Suvarna's son; Suman's brother; Amey and Prachi's cousin; Apoorva's husband.

Recurring 
Shashank's family
 Sharad Ponkshe as Vinayak Kanitkar – Patriarchy of Kanitkars'; Vitthal, Vidya and Vikas's brother; Madhavi's husband; Amey's father.
 Supriya Pathare as Madhavi Vinayak Kanitkar – Vinayak's wife, Amey's mother.
 Mangesh Kadam as Vitthal Kanitkar – Vinayak, Vidya and Vikas's brother; Suvarna's husband, Shashank and Suman's father.
 Leena Bhagwat as Suvarna Vithhal Kanitkar – Vitthal's wife, Shashank and Suman's mother.
 Atul Todankar as Vikas (Cookie) Kanitkar – Vinayak, Vitthal and Vidya's brother; Aparna's husband; Prachi's father.
 Sheetal Kulkarni as Aparna Vikas Kanitkar – Vikas's wife; Prachi's mother.
 Sarika Nilatkar-Nawathe as Vidya (Babi) Kanitkar / Vidya Bhaskar Vaidya – A Teacher; Vinayak, Vitthal and Vikas's sister.
 Veena Jagtap as Avantika Vinayak Kanitkar / Avantika Chaudhari – Vinayak and Madhavi's daughter.
 Swapnil Kale as Amey Vinayak Kanitkar – Vinayak and Madhavi's son; Shashank, Suman and Prachi's cousin; Manasi's husband.
 Amruta Phadake / Sai Kalyankar as Manasi Amey Kanitkar – Amey's wife.
 Namrata Pradhan as Suman Vithhal Kanitkar / Suman Nikhil Darekar (Sumi) – Vitthal and Suvarna's daughter; Shashank's sister; Amey and Prachi's cousin; Nikhil's wife.
 Tanvi Barve as Prachi Vikas Kanitkar – Vikas and Aparna's daughter; Amey, Shashank and Suman's cousin.

Apoorva's family
 Rajan Tamhane as Dr. Kaushik Vartak – Sarika's brother; Anjali's estranged husband; Apoorva's father.
 Mugdha Godbole-Ranade as Dr. Anjali Kaushik Vartak – Kaushik's estranged wife; Apoorva's estranged mother.
 Radhika Harshe-Vidyasagar as Sarika Vartak – Kaushik's sister; Netra's mother; Apoorva's mother-figure.
 Snehlata Maghade / Pranjal Ambavane as Netra – Sarika's daughter; Apoorva's cousin.

Others
 Shrikant Bhide / Guru Divekar as Nikhil Darekar – Suman's husband.
 Kashyap Parulekar as Bhaskar Vaidya – Vidya's love interest.
 Ashwini Apte as Deepali
 Maithili Patwardhan as Ovi, Deepali's daughter 
 Bipin Surve as Apoorva's boyfriend
 Ashutosh Kulkarni as Abhay
 Ujjawala Jog as Shakuntala
 Shubha Khote as Durga
 Mangesh Desai as Dhananjay Karmarkar

Production

Development 
Rupali Guha and Kalyan Guha, the producer of Film Farm India announces the Marathi remake of Khorkuto a Bengali series aired on Star Jalsha. The title song was composed by Nilesh Moharir and lyrics by Rohini Ninawe and sung by Sai Tembhekar.

Casting 
Dnyanada Ramtirthkar was selected for the role of Apoorva and Chetan Vadnere selected for the role of Shashank. Mugdha Godbole plays the role of Apoorva's mother and Sharad Ponkshe the role of Vinayak Kanitkar.

Mahaepisode (1 hour) 
 7 November 2021
 12 December 2021
 30 January 2022
 13 February 2022
 20 March 2022
 17 July 2022
 2 October 2022
 4 December 2022
 29 January 2023
 12 March 2023

Awards

Adaptations

References

External links 
 
 Thipkyanchi Rangoli at Disney+ Hotstar

Marathi-language television shows
2021 Indian television series debuts
Star Pravah original programming